Gosforth East Middle School is a middle school in Gosforth, Newcastle upon Tyne, England. Students usually transfer to Gosforth High School. The school is in the Parklands electoral ward.

History 

The school started in 1960 as Gosforth East Secondary School and became Gosforth East Middle School when Northumberland County Council changed to a three-tier education system in 1973.

In 2003, Gosforth East had a new building erected. This building costing £4 million was officially opened on 12 September 2003 by David Bell, who then was Chief Inspector of Schools.

Gosforth East was inspected by Ofsted in 2009; the report noted, "this is a good and improving school."

In 2014 the Gosforth Schools Trust was formed with Archibald First, Archbishop Runcie CE First, Broadway East First, Brunton First, Dinnington First, Gosforth Central Middle, Gosforth East Middle, Gosforth Park First, Grange First, Regent Farm First and South Gosforth First School.

Results 
The KS2 SATs results score by year are listed below:

Feeder schools 
 Broadway East First School
 Dinnington First School
 Gosforth Park First School

Notable alumni 
 Robbie Elliott, retired footballer notably for Newcastle United.
 Ben Price, Actor, known for roles in Casualty and Footballers' Wives.

References

External links 
 
 Gosforth East Middle information at Newcastle City Council

Educational institutions established in 1960
Middle schools in Newcastle upon Tyne
1960 establishments in England
Foundation schools in Newcastle upon Tyne